Nelson Township is a township in Cloud County, Kansas, USA.  As of the 2000 census, its population was 137.

History
Nelson Township was organized in 1872.

Geography
According to the USGS, it contains two cemeteries: Nelson and Rice.

References

 USGS Geographic Names Information System (GNIS)

External links
 US-Counties.com
 City-Data.com

Townships in Cloud County, Kansas
Townships in Kansas